Stephen Jones (born 16 September 1962) is an English musician and novelist.

Career

Lo-fi period 
After studying at Nottingham Trent University, Jones became involved with an experimental theatre company, Dogs in Honey, in Nottingham in the late 1980s, writing songs for productions.

By 1994, Jones had written over 400 songs and gained a publishing contract with Chrysalis Music. However, he was unable to gain a recording contract, and formed a plan to self-finance the release of a series of albums featuring his home demos, limited to 1,000 copies of each, under the name Baby Bird.

The first of these was I Was Born a Man, released in August 1995 and positively received by the NME.

Babybird the band 
During the second half of 1995, Jones toured under the name Babybird with Huw Chadbourne (keyboards), Robert Gregory (drums), John Pedder (bass) and Luke Scott (guitar). Two further collections of demos were released, Bad Shave and Fatherhood (a fourth album, The Happiest Man Alive was released in early 1996).

By the end of the year, a decent public following had been built up, as well as quite considerable excitement within the press and music industry. Babybird were signed to Echo Records (a division of the Chrysalis Group), and the first "proper" single, a full-band recording of "Goodnight", which had appeared in demo form on Fatherhood, was eventually released in the summer of 1996, becoming a minor chart hit in the UK.

"You're Gorgeous" 
The second single, "You're Gorgeous", reached number 3 in the UK singles chart in October 1996, and was also one of the biggest selling singles of the year, going on to chart around the world.

After "You're Gorgeous" 
The album Ugly Beautiful produced two more hit singles, "Candy Girl" and "Cornershop". Shortly after Ugly Beautiful, a fifth album of demos was released – Dying Happy.

Babybird returned in 1998 with There's Something Going On, preceded by a single, "Bad Old Man". The album was a modest success and was followed by further minor hits, "If You'll Be Mine" and "Back Together".

The 2000 album Bugged was well-received critically. However, sales were poor and the two singles from it, "The F-Word" (later the theme tune to a UK TV cookery show of the same name) and "Out of Sight" barely dented the charts. Babybird were dropped by their record label soon after. A third single from the album "Fireflies/Getaway" was released on Animal Noise records, but sold few copies. The band subsequently split.

After Babybird 
In the following years, Jones returned to where he had started – releasing albums of demos (under his own name) to a small but appreciative audience. This time round he produced two albums of instrumental music designed to help him develop a career in film music. Stephen Jones 1985–2001 was released in 2001, and Plastic Tablets came out in 2003. Stephen created the soundtrack for the film Blessed in 2004.

Between the two instrumental albums, Stephen collaborated with the Manchester-based dance artist Aim on a single, "Good Disease", and worked on an album of demo songs. This became the hip-hop influenced Almost Cured of Sadness, on Sanctuary Records. Again, Stephen was to score a critical success, but legal problems over samples delayed its release. It and the single "Friend" received little promotion and sold few copies.

In October 2005, a posting on the official Babybird website announced that the band had reformed. The subsequent album was called Between My Ears There Is Nothing But Music. Again, Babybird failed to achieve commercial success, and were dropped by the Echo label.

Two more albums followed on Unison records: 2010's "Ex-Maniac", and 2011's "The Pleasures of Self Destruction". Sales were disappointing, and Unison declined to release further Babybird albums.

Death of the Neighbourhood 
In 2008, Jones worked on a solo project entitled 'Death of the Neighbourhood' . The eponymous debut album, a 32 track 2-disc CD set was released on 10 November 2008 on ATIC Records. The album features "Cokeholes", which was released as a three track single on 27 October 2008.

Black Reindeer 
In 2012, Stephen Jones announced the beginning of a new musical identity, Black Reindeer. The first Black Reindeer album, "Music for the Film That Never Got Made", was released on Bandcamp. Seven more albums of instrumental music followed through 2013.

The Great Sadness
In 2013, Jones released a new song with vocals entitled "The Great Sadness".

Fiction 
Stephen Jones has produced two works of fiction, The Bad Book in 2000 and Harry and Ida Swop Teeth (also the title of a Babybird b-side) in 2003. He also collaborated with DED Associates, who have designed many of his CD covers, on a 2000 art book Travel Sickness.

Published works (UK)

Baby Bird discography

Singles 
"Snake Caves" / "Lemonade Baby" (Gorgonzola Records, October 1995)
"Drunk Car" (Easy! Tiger Records, July 1999)

Compilation tracks and guest appearances 
"Larry Bright" (on Mortal Wombat EP, Fierce Panda Records, October 1995)
"Alan Ladd" (on Volume 15, Volume Records, February 1996)
"Plastic Diamond" (with All Seeing I on Pickled Eggs and Sherbet, FFRR, September 1999)

Albums 
I Was Born a Man (Baby Bird Recordings, July 1995)

"I'll just say that I Was Born A Man is the only record I've heard this year with lyrics worth remembering and music that's impossible to forget, because I'd rather you listen to it than me talking about it." – Melody Maker

"...whatever ultra-naff low-fidelity keyboard tinklings he undertakes; he carries with him incredibly touching pieces like Dead Bird Sings that create, in the middle of this tank top of a record, an altogether different kind of sadness." – NME

Bad Shave (Baby Bird Recordings, October 1995)

"...unique, customised but never self-indulgent or irritatingly inaccessible. It's as off as it's beautiful, as rich as it's lo fi... imagine Ray Davies emerging, blinking and bearded, Howard Hughes like, after years in the darkness and you'll have some idea of the deeply, deeply English yet marvellously, utterly alien world of Baby Bird." – Melody Maker

Fatherhood (Baby Bird Recordings, December 1995)

"...a mixture of whimsy, egotism and madness with a good bit of talent stirred in...his puzzled world-view is unique. He fills the 20 tracks with strangenesses. Weirdly wonderful." – The Guardian

"Fatherhood is another unpredictable and magical journey through the thoughts of Stephen Jones, a man who is clearly in love with sweet melodies and the millions of ways you can fuck them up...you might find the whole experience as cigar-puffingly satisfying as becoming a dad." – The Independent

The Happiest Man Alive (Baby Bird Recordings, April 1996) No. 127

"...an oblique sadist of spectacular talent. The Happiest Man Alive has an entire central nervous system of its own. It's a Frankenstein's monster of an album, gruesome and miraculous, stitched together from what would appear to be fragments of a dozen different psyches lodged inside one head." – Melody Maker

Dying Happy (Baby Bird Recordings, November 1996)

"Halfway between songs and instrumentals, some of the tracks on Dying Happy just don't work at all, but some of them are riveting." – The Times

The Original Lo-Fi (Sanctuary Records, November 2002)

"The five albums in question form a song-cycle tracking the life-cycle from birth to death. The sheer wealth and diversity of music crammed into this tiny box makes it an absolute bargain." – The Independent

"The Original Lo-Fi should cement Baby Bird's reputation as one of the finest experimental pop artists of his time ... Written, performed, and produced as only Stephen Jones is capable of, the songs compiled on The Original Lo-Fi are easily among the finest musical confections of a generation." – AllMusic

Babybird discography

Singles
"Goodnight" (Echo Records, June 1996) No. 28 UK
"You're Gorgeous" (Echo Records, September 1996) No. 3 UK
"Candy Girl" (Echo Records, February 1997) No. 14 UK
"Cornershop" (Echo Records, May 1997) No. 37 UK
"Bad Old Man" (Echo Records, April 1998) No. 31 UK
"If You'll Be Mine" (Echo Records, July 1998) No. 28 UK
"Back Together (remix)" (Echo Records, February 1999) No. 22 UK
"The F-Word" (Echo Records, March 2000) No. 35 UK
"Out of Sight" (Echo Records, May 2000) No. 58 UK
"Getaway" / "Fireflies" (Animal Noise, September 2000)
"Lighter N Spoon" (popup records Hamburg, April 2008)

Compilation tracks
"Bad Twin" (on The Avengers OST, Atlantic Records, August 1998)

Albums
Ugly Beautiful (Echo Records, October 1996) No. 9
There's Something Going On (Echo Records, August 1998) No. 28
Bugged (Echo Records, June 2000) No. 104
Best of Babybird (Echo Records, February 2004)
Between My Ears There's Nothing But Music (Echo Records, September 2006 and popup records Hamburg, February 2008)
Ex-Maniac 2010
The Pleasures of Self Destruction (31 October 2011)
Happy Stupid Nothing (7 March 2019)

Stephen Jones solo discography

Singles
"Good Disease" (with Aim, Grand Central Records, June 2002)
"Friend" (Sanctuary Records, June 2003)

Compilation tracks
"We Make All the Flowers Grow" (with Luke Scott on Total Lee, a Tribute to Lee Hazlewood, City Slang Records, June 2002)

Film score
Blessed (Warner Bros, 2004)

Albums
Stephen Jones 1985–2001 (Easy! Tiger Records, October 2001)

"This isn't the best introduction to Stephen Jones. Nonetheless, '1985–2001' is another interesting dispatch from the no-frills renaissance man." – NME 
Almost Cured of Sadness (Sanctuary Records, March 2003)

"He was always an affecting songwriter as well as an extremely able band frontman, but it is these solo lo-fi tinkerings that really provide the keys to his soul. His latest LP is a delight, an effortless charmer on which the childlike sweetness of his voice perfectly serves 19 deceptively simple songs that together make a series of multi-textured gems." – The Times 

Plastic Tablets (Delf Music, September 2003)

"This vast collection of poignant, evocative instrumental work – like soundtracks for imaginary movies – reminds you why there was so much fuss about him." – Daily Telegraph

Albums as Black Reindeer

Music For the Film That Never Got Made (October 2012)
Real Life is Overrated (December 2012)
A Difficult Third Album (February 2013)
Due to a Lack of Excitement (March 2013)
All Is Good (April 2013)
The Ten Stages of Alcohol (June 2013)
The End of Youth (July 2013)
Death Is Stupid (September 2013)
Death Is Stupid 2 (October 2013)

Stephen Jones fiction
The Bad Book (IMP Fiction, London, March 2000)

"Veering imperiously between maudlin monochrome and exuberant technicolor, he proves as adept with narrative and metaphor as he is with choruses and couplets." – The Times

Travel Sickness (Die Gestalten Verlag, Berlin, September 2000)

"...maximalism at its most memorable and unnerving. Find it." – I-D Magazine

Harry and Ida Swop Teeth (IMP Fiction, London, April 2003)

"Nightmarish and weird, but unsettlingly compelling" – BBC

References

External links
September 2006 interview of "Babybird" (Stephen Jones) by Jane Gazzo
Stephen Jones on Twitter
Black Reindeer Twitter feed
Stephen Jones' official Bandcamp page

21st-century English novelists
English male singers
English pop musicians
Britpop musicians
Alumni of Nottingham Trent University
1962 births
Living people
People from Telford
Writers from Shropshire
English male novelists
Countertenors
21st-century English male writers
Musicians from Shropshire